Dolichupis janae is a species of small sea snail, a marine gastropod mollusk in the family Triviidae, the false cowries or trivias.

Description

Distribution
This species occurs in the Indian Ocean off Sri Lanka

References

 Fehse D. (2002) Beiträge zur Kenntnis der Triviidae (Mollusca: Gastropoda) V. Kritische Beurteilung der Genera und Beschreibung einer neuen Art der Gattung Semitrivia Cossmann, 1903. Acta Conchyliorum 6: 3-48.
 Fehse D. & Grego J. (2010) Contributions to the knowledge of the Triviidae XV. News on the genus Dolichupis Iredale, 1930 (Mollusca: Gastropoda). Visaya 2(6): 4-20 page(s): 16

External links
 

Triviidae